This is a partial list of shipwrecks which occurred in the Atlantic Ocean. The list includes ships that sank, foundered, grounded, or were otherwise lost. The Atlantic Ocean is here defined in its widest sense to include: the Baltic Sea; Black Sea; the Caribbean Sea and Gulf of Mexico; the English Channel; the Labrador Sea; the Mediterranean Sea; the Mid-Atlantic; the North Sea; and the Norwegian Sea.

Baltic Sea

Bay of Biscay

Black Sea

Caribbean Sea

Gulf of Mexico

English Channel

Irish Sea

Labrador Sea

Mediterranean Sea

Mid-Atlantic

North Channel

North Sea

Norwegian Sea

South Atlantic

West Africa

ARA Bahía Paraíso

References

Atlantic Ocean
Shipwrecks in the Atlantic Ocean List of